Vijay Goel may refer to:

Vijay Goel (politician) (born 1954), Indian politician
Vijay K. Goel, American engineer